Alsophila imrayana, synonym Cyathea imrayana, is a species of tree fern native to Dominica, Costa Rica, Panama, Venezuela, and Ecuador.

Description
It is covered with sharp, blackish spines and pale brown hairs. Fronds are bipinnate,  in length, and occur in whorls of five. The crown is large and spreading, especially in young plants.

The rachis and stipe range in colouration from brown to dark brown and bear bicoloured scales (brown centre and paler margin) with a terminal seta. Scales on pinnule veins are whitish. Sori are round and borne on either side of the pinnule midvein, towards the base of the pinnule segment. They are protected by red-brown, globose indusia.

The specific epithet imrayana commemorates plant collector John Imray (1811-1880), who collected the type material.

References

imrayana
Ferns of the Americas
Flora of Costa Rica
Flora of Dominica
Ferns of Ecuador
Flora of Panama
Flora of Saint Vincent and the Grenadines
Flora of Venezuela